Sejak, also called dumul-cha, refers to nokcha (green tea) made of young, tender leaves and buds hand-plucked after gogu ("grain rain", 20–21 April) but before ipha ("advent of summer", 5–6 May).

References 

Green tea
Korean tea